The Universities' Police Science Institute, or UPSI as it is more commonly known, is a joint venture between South Wales Police, Cardiff University and the University of South Wales. The Universities' Police Science Institute (UPSI) was formed in 2007 to develop research into Policing; Since its inception the Universities' Police Science Institute has achieved international renown for its innovations in designing, developing and assessing new solutions to policing problems.

About UPSI
The Universities' Police Science Institute is responsible for conducting research in areas, such as, Major Crime Investigations, Neighbourhood Policing and Crime Analysis.

In addition to their main research the UPSI team have a vast expertise within Policing generally and have helped to influence ACPO, Home Office and HMIC policies over the last decade; Especially within the areas of:

 Reassurance and Neighbourhood Policing
 nikunj-Terrorism
 Democratic Policing
 Anti Social Behaviour

Notable Staff
 Professor Martin Innes (UPSI Director) ~ Cardiff University Social Science Professor.
 Dr. Colin Roberts (UPSI Operations Manager) ~ UPSIs' Lead on Counter-Terrorism Policing.
 Dr. Timothy Brain, OBE, QPM, FRSA ~ Former Chief Constable of Gloucestershire Police [2001 - 2010]

Research

The Universities' Police Science Institute receives the majority of its research funding from the Economic and Social Research Council (ESRC). Since its launch in 2007 UPSI has received over 2 million in external research funding.

Currently UPSIs' research is focused on three main areas namely:
 Community Intelligence or Neighbourhood Policing.
 Countering Violent Extremism.
 Policing Innovation and Reform.

Projects
Currently the Universities' Police Science Institute (UPSI) is working on three major projects inconjunction with its Research; These projects involve other Partner Agencies, such as, South Wales Police and the Police Academy of Netherlands.

UPSIs' three projects are namely;

Tackling Radicalisation in Dispersed Societies (TaRDiS):

Tackling Radicalisation in Dispersed Societies (TaRDis) is a multi-agency project involving the London Borough of Sutton, the Police Academy of the Netherlands and UPSI funded by the European Commission. TaRDis objectives is to explore how the risks of radicalisation can be reduced in communities where there are no defined population centres or clusters.

Community Policing and Community Intelligence:

Community Policing and Community Intelligence is an ongoing project between South Wales Police and the Universities' Police Science Institute exploring the application of community intelligence in areas of 'policing' priorities within South Wales.

Safer Sutton Partnership:

The Safer Sutton Partnership is a joint venture between the London Borough of Sutton and other agencies, including UPSI. The Safer Sutton Partnership is in its fifth consecutive year and is designed to use community intelligence gathering methodology to understand local community concerns and inform interventions to address them through Neighbourhood Policing.

Publications
Since 2007 UPSI have published multiple journals, research reports, briefing notes and official reports for the Home Office, HMIC, ACPO and numerous other agencies; The most well-known UPSI Publications are:

 Assessing the Effects of Prevent Policing - A Report to the Association of Chief Police Officers (ACPO).
 Re-thinking the Policing of Anti-Social Behaviour - A Report to HMIC.
 Policing, Situational Intelligence and the Information Environment - A Report to HMIC.

References

External links
 UPSI website
 South Wales Police website
 University of Glamorgan website
 University of Cardiff website

Law enforcement in the United Kingdom
2007 establishments in the United Kingdom
Organisations based in Cardiff